Joseph Eric D'Arcy (25 April 1924 – 12 December 2005) was the ninth Archbishop of the Catholic Archdiocese of Hobart, Tasmania, Australia from 1988 to 1999. Immediately prior to his appointment to Hobart, D'Arcy served as the sixth Bishop of the Diocese of Sale from 1981 to 1988.

Early life and education
D'Arcy was born in Melbourne, and grew up in the suburb of Brighton. He was educated at Our Lady of Lourdes Parish School, Armadale; De La Salle College, Malvern; Corpus Christi College, Werribee; and the University of Melbourne, where he graduated with a Bachelor of Arts degree with First Class Honours and an Exhibition in Philosophy, and a Master of Arts in Philosophy. He later pursued doctoral studies in philosophy at the University of Oxford, where he was the first Australian-born philosopher to receive an Oxford doctorate, and the Pontifical Gregorian University in Rome.

He was ordained as a priest in 1949, and also taught in the Philosophy Department at University of Melbourne, eventually becoming its head, and was the author of Conscience and its Right to Freedom (Sheed and Ward, 1961) and Human Acts: an essay in their moral evaluation (Clarendon Press, 1963).  He also participated as translator and commentator on the 60 volume English version of Thomas Aquinas' Summa.

He garnered unwanted notoriety in 1955, when a letter undersigned by him was leaked to the press confirming the existence of 'The Movement' (modelled on Catholic Action groups in Europe) within the Australian Labor Party. The resulting furore contributed to the Labor Split.

Bishop of Sale and Archbishop of Hobart
He became Bishop of Sale, Victoria, in 1981 before his appointment to Hobart in 1988, and was Archbishop Emeritus of Hobart from his retirement in 1999 until his death in Melbourne in 2005, aged 81.

References

1924 births
2005 deaths
Religious leaders from Melbourne
Roman Catholic archbishops of Hobart
Academic staff of the University of Melbourne
20th-century Roman Catholic archbishops in Australia
Roman Catholic bishops of Sale
University of Melbourne alumni
Alumni of the University of Oxford
Pontifical Gregorian University alumni